The San Francisco VA Medical Center, also called the San Francisco Veterans Affairs Medical Center or the SFVAMC, is a Veterans Affairs medical center, located in San Francisco. The main facility is on 42nd Avenue and Clement Street at the former Fort Miley Military Reservation in the Richmond District. Fort Miley is located south of the Golden Gate and west of the San Francisco Presidio, on Point Lobos (San Francisco) surrounded by the Golden Gate National Recreation Area.

SFVAMC has the largest funded research program in the Veterans Health Administration with $90.2 million in research expenditures (2015). The current Medical Center Director is Bonnie S. Graham. It serves as a teaching hospital for the UCSF School of Medicine.

History
The SFVAMC was founded in 1934.

Community-based outpatient clinics have been opened by the SFVAMC. They include:
San Francisco VA Downtown Clinic – primary medical care, comprehensive homeless center, psychosocial and health care services.
Clearlake VA Clinic, Clearlake
Eureka VA Clinic, Eureka
San Bruno VA Clinic, San Bruno
Santa Rosa VA Clinic, Santa Rosa
Ukiah VA Clinic, Ukiah

Achievements
SFVAMC has several National Centers of Excellence in the areas of: Epilepsy treatment; Cardiac surgery; Posttraumatic stress disorder; HIV; and Renal dialysis.

The SFVAMC's "Telephone Linked Care Program" is accredited by the URAC.

Partnerships
SFVAMC has been affiliated with the University of California, San Francisco School of Medicine (UCSF) for over 50 years.  All physicians are jointly recruited by SFVAMC and UCSF School of Medicine.

The Northern California Institute of Research and Education is an independent non-profit research organization which is resident in the SFVAMC grounds.

The City College of San Francisco partnered with the SFVAMC to set up a veterans affairs health office on campus to target students using the G.I. Bill. The pilot program was reviewed by Craig Newmark in the San Francisco Chronicle, who stated that it is a good model for delivering healthcare services to young veterans nationwide.

References

External links

Northern California Institute of Research and Education

Hospitals in San Francisco
Veterans Affairs medical facilities
Richmond District, San Francisco
Hospital buildings completed in 1934
Hospital buildings on the National Register of Historic Places in California
Government buildings on the National Register of Historic Places in San Francisco
Teaching hospitals in California
1934 establishments in California